João Leiva Campos Filho, usually called Leivinha (little Leiva), (born 11 September 1949) is a Brazilian former footballer who played as a striker or as a winger.

Club career
A talented, flamboyant and mercurial player, at club level, Leivinha played for Portuguesa, Palmeiras, and Atlético de Madrid, winning national championships in both Brazil and Spain, as well as the UEFA and Intercontinental Cups.

International career
Leivinha achieved 21 international caps for Brazil, from June 1972 until June 1974, scoring seven goals. He appeared in 4 games (three of the first consecutive of the tournament scoring 2 goals), with the Brazil national football team at the 1974 FIFA World Cup.

Personal life
Leivinha is the uncle of Gremio midfielder Lucas Leiva.

Honours
Palmeiras
Brazilian Série A: 1972, 1973
São Paulo State League: 1972, 1974
Atletico Madrid
Spanish League: 1976–77

References

External links
 Brazilian FA Database

1949 births
Living people
Brazilian footballers
Brazil international footballers
1974 FIFA World Cup players
La Liga players
Atlético Madrid footballers
Sociedade Esportiva Palmeiras players
São Paulo FC players
Association football forwards
Footballers from São Paulo (state)
Brazilian expatriate sportspeople in Spain
Expatriate footballers in Spain
People from Novo Horizonte, São Paulo